The 1977 JSL Cup was contested by 20 teams, and Furukawa Electric won the championship.

Results

East-A

East-B

West-A

West-B

Quarterfinals
Nippon Kokan 0-2 Honda
Yanmar Diesel 1-0 Mitsubishi Motors
Fujita Industries 4-0 Kyoto Shiko
Nippon Steel 0-2 Furukawa Electric

Semifinal
Honda 2-3 Yanmar Diesel
Fujita Industries 1-2 Furukawa Electric

Final
Yanmar Diesel 0-4 Furukawa Electric
Furukawa Electric won the championship

References
 

JSL Cup
League Cup